The  Kansas City Command season was the fourth season for the franchise in the Arena Football League, and the first under their new team name, having previously been known as the Kansas City Brigade. The team was coached by Danton Barto and played their home games at Sprint Center. This is the first season for the Command since 2008, after the league went on hiatus in 2009 and the franchise was not active in 2010. The Command finished the season 6–12, failing to qualify for the playoffs.

Standings

Regular season schedule
The Command began the season on the road against the Dallas Vigilantes on March 12. Their first home game of the season did not come until April 15 when they took on the Iowa Barnstormers. They played the Tulsa Talons at home in their final regular season game.

Roster

Regular season

Week 1: at Dallas Vigilantes

Week 2: at San Jose SaberCats

Week 3: BYE

Week 4: at Spokane Shock

Week 5: vs. Iowa Barnstormers

Week 6: vs. Arizona Rattlers

Week 7: at Chicago Rush

Week 8: vs. Dallas Vigilantes

Week 9: vs. New Orleans VooDoo

Week 10: at Tampa Bay Storm

Week 11: at Tulsa Talons

Week 12: vs. Spokane Shock

Week 13: vs. Chicago Rush

Week 14: at Milwaukee Mustangs

Week 15: vs. Cleveland Gladiators

Week 16: at Utah Blaze

Week 17: BYE

Week 18: at Iowa Barnstormers

Week 19: vs. Jacksonville Sharks

Week 20: vs. Tulsa Talons

References

Kansas City Command
Kansas City Command seasons